The 2015–16 Utah Runnin' Utes men's basketball team represented the University of Utah during the 2015–16 NCAA Division I men's basketball season. They played their home games at the Jon M. Huntsman Center in Salt Lake City as members of the Pac-12 Conference. The Utes were led by fifth year head coach Larry Krystkowiak. They the season 27–9, 13-5 in Pac-12 play to finish in second place. They defeated USC and California to advance to the championship game of the  Pac-12 tournament where they lost to Oregon. They received an at-large bid to the NCAA tournament where they defeated Fresno State in the first round to advance to the second round where they lost to Gonzaga.

Previous season
The 2014–15 Utah Utes finished the season 26–9, 13–5 in the Pac-12, to finish in a tie for second place. In the Pac-12 tournament, the Utes made it to the semifinals where they lost to Oregon. They received an at-large bid to the NCAA tournament as a 5-seed where they defeated Stephen F. Austin in the second round, and Georgetown in the third round to advance to the Sweet Sixteen where they lost to Duke.

Off-season

Departures

Incoming transfers

2015 recruiting class

Roster

Schedule

|-
!colspan=12 style="background:#; color:white;"| Exhibition

|-
!colspan=12 style="background:#; color:white;"| Non-conference regular season

|-
!colspan=12 style="background:#;"| Pac-12 regular season

|-
!colspan=12 style="background:#;"| Pac-12 Tournament

|-
!colspan=12 style="background:#;"| NCAA tournament

Rankings

References

2015–16 Pac-12 Conference men's basketball season
2015-16 team
2015 in sports in Utah
2016 in sports in Utah
2016 NCAA Division I men's basketball tournament participants